The 19025 / 19026  Surat–Amravati Express is an express train belonging to Western Railway zone that runs between  and Amravati railway station in India. It is currently being operated with 19025/19026 train numbers on tri-weekly basis.

Service

The 19025/Surat–Amravati Express has an average speed of 49 km/hr and covers 562 km in 11 hours 30 mins.
The 19026/Amravati–Surat Express has an average speed of 47 km/hr and covers 562 km in 12 hours.

Route and halts 

The important halts of the train are:

Coach composition

The train has standard ICF rakes with max speed of 110 kmph. The train consists of 16 coaches:

 3 second seating
 11 General unreserved
 2 seating cum luggage rake

Traction

Both trains are hauled by a Valsad Loco Shed-based WAG-5P / WAG-5A electric locomotive from Surat to Amravati and vice versa.

References

Notes

External links 

 59025/Surat–Amravati fast passenger India Rail info
 59026/Amravati–Surat fast passenger India Rail info

Rail transport in Gujarat
Rail transport in Maharashtra
Transport in Surat
Transport in Amravati
Express trains in India
Railway services introduced in 2017